Wintzenheim is a commune in the Haut-Rhin département in Grand Est in north-eastern France.

Its inhabitants are called Wintzenheimois.

Geography
Wintzenheim is a town of 7,853 inhabitants (2019) to the west of Colmar in the Haut-Rhin departement of France.

Colmar is a town which receives very little rain because it benefits from a microclimate (called the micro-climat des ) due to the effect of a vortex propagated by the Munster valley with winds from the south-west to west. Situated only 3 km from Colmar, Wintzenheim benefits from this micro-climate.

Gallery

History
Until the French Revolution, Wintzenheim was a dependency of the Lords of Hohlandsbourg. It was administered by the Ribeaupierre family and later by the Counts of Lupfen and, in the 16th century, by Lazarus von Schwendi (also known as Lazare de Schwendi). Louvois rewarded general Joseph de Montclar with this fief in 1680.

Population

Twin town
  Möhnesee in Germany

Sites and monuments
 Château du Hohlandsbourg 
 Château du Pflixbourg
 La Chapelle Herzog : the sculptures of this neo-gothic chapel are listed as monuments historiques by the French Ministry of Culture.

People
 Tomi Ungerer (1931 - ), illustrator best known for his erotic and political illustrations as well as children's books, stayed in Wintzenheim during his childhood. A community hall today bears his name.

See also
 Communes of the Haut-Rhin department

References

External links

 Official website of the Mairie
 Site dedicated to Wintzenheim and its history

Communes of Haut-Rhin